Noviomagus, also known as Noviomagus Cantiacorum (Latin for "Noviomagus of the Cantiaci") to distinguish it from other places with that name, was a Roman settlement in southeastern Britain. It was just southeast of the Thames ford near Westminster on the British Watling Street and the Thames bridge at Londinium along the Roman route.

See also
Noviomagus of the Kings in Chichester

References

History of the London Borough of Bexley
Roman towns and cities in England